Theo Ernst Stapelberg (born ) is a South African rugby union player who last played for the  in Pro14, the  in the Currie Cup and the  in the Rugby Challenge. His regular position is fly-half.

Rugby career

Youth rugby

Stapelberg was born in Bloemfontein, but grew up in Port Elizabeth. He represented  throughout his school career, playing for them at the Under-13 Craven Week in 2008, the Under-16 Grant Khomo Week in 2011 and the Under-18 Craven Week tournaments in both 2012 and 2013.

After school, Stapelberg moved to Cape Town to join the  academy. He progressed through the age groups, playing for the  team in 2015 and also representing university side  in the Varsity Cup.

Western Province

Stapelberg made his first class debut in 2017, coming on as a replacement in 's 35–28 victory over neighbours  in the 2018 Rugby Challenge, and made a further two appearances as a replacement in the competition.

Free State Cheetahs

He made his Currie Cup debut for the Cheetahs against former side  in their Round Nine clash in the Currie Cup Premier Division, and was drafted into the  Pro14 squad, making his debut in that competition a week later, kicking seven conversions in a 54–39 victory over Italian side . He started their next matches in that competition, scoring 72 points in total, and also made a further appearance for the Free State Cheetahs in the Currie Cup.

References

South African rugby union players
Living people
1995 births
Rugby union players from Bloemfontein
Rugby union fly-halves
Cheetahs (rugby union) players
Free State Cheetahs players
Western Province (rugby union) players